Thubana leucosphena is a species of moth of the family Lecithoceridae. It is found in China (Anhui, Fujian, Jiangxi, Henan, Hunan, Hubei, Guizhou and Zhejiang) and Vietnam.

External links
Review of the genus Thubana Walker (Lepidoptera, Lecithoceridae) from China, with description of one new species

Moths described in 1931
Thubana